Radzky Syahwal Ginting (born 1 December 2003) is an Indonesian professional footballer who plays as a central midfielder for Liga 1 club Persija Jakarta.

Club career

Persija Jakarta
He was signed for Persija Jakarta to play in Liga 1 in the 2021 season. Ginting made his first-team debut on 5 September 2021 as a substitute in a match against PSS Sleman at the Pakansari Stadium, Cibinong.

Career statistics

Club

Notes

References

External links
 Radzky Ginting at Soccerway
 Radzky Ginting at Liga Indonesia

2003 births
Living people
Karo people
Indonesian footballers
Liga 1 (Indonesia) players
Persija Jakarta players
Association football midfielders
People from Bekasi
Sportspeople from West Java